Platysphinx dorsti is a moth of the  family Sphingidae. It is known from Ethiopia.

References

Platysphinx
Moths described in 1977